is a railway station on the Muroran Main Line in Noboribetsu, Hokkaido, Japan, operated by Hokkaido Railway Company (JR Hokkaido). The station is numbered "H28".

Lines
Noboribetsu Station is served by the Muroran Main Line.

Station layout
The station has one side platform and one island platform, serving three tracks, with an additional through track between platforms 1 and 2.

History
The station was opened by the Hokkaido Colliery and Railway Company on August 1, 1892, when the line between Higashi-Muroran Station and Iwamizawa Station opened.

Surrounding area
The station is a gateway to the Noboribetsu Onsen hot spring area, which is connected by a 15-minute bus ride from the station.

See also
 List of railway stations in Japan

References

External links

  

Railway stations in Japan opened in 1892
Railway stations in Hokkaido Prefecture
Stations of Hokkaido Railway Company